The 2012 Uttarakhand Legislative Assembly election were the third Vidhan Sabha (Legislative Assembly) election of the state. Elections were held on 30 January 2012 when Indian National Congress emerged as the largest party with 32 seats in the 70-seat legislature and formed the government with the help of Bahujan Samaj Party, Uttarakhand Kranti Dal (P) and Independents. The Bharatiya Janata Party with 31 seats served as the official opposition.

The Indian National Congress emerged as the largest party with 32 seats in a house of 70. They were still four short of the majority to form a government. After much wrangling it was announced that the Bahujan Samaj Party, Uttarakhand Kranti Dal (P) and the three Independents would be supporting the government. The incumbent Bharatiya Janata Party Government lost as they had only 31 seats out of 70 seats, lagging just one seat behind Indian National Congress.

After protracted discussions it was announced the Vijay Bahuguna would be Chief Minister and Harish Rawat would continue to serve as the Union Minister for Water Resources in the UPA government at Union level.

Party position in the Assembly

Key post holders in the Assembly
 Speaker :  Govind Singh Kunjwal
 Deputy Speaker : Anusuya Prasad Maikhuri
 Leader of the House: Vijay Bahuguna (2012–2014)Harish Rawat (2014–2017)
 Leader of the Opposition : Ajay Bhatt
 Chief Secretary : Devi Prasad Gairola

List of the Third Assembly members

By-elections

See also
 2012 Uttarakhand Legislative Assembly election
 Vijay Bahuguna ministry
 Harish Rawat ministry
 Progressive Democratic Front (Uttarakhand)
 Politics of Uttarakhand

Notes
 † – Died in office
 ‡ – Resigned from office
 # – Elected to the 16th Lok Sabha

References

Indian politics articles by importance
Uttarakhand Legislative Assembly